Ibejii is a British-Nigerian altenative and Afro-soul singer-songwriter, whose full-length 5th studio album Intermission won the Best alternative album at the Headies Awards of 2022.

Early life 
Born in London, England, and raised between the Northern Nigeria and the United Kingdom. Ibejii grew up with his siblings and grew up with a sense of abandonment because his parents were very into each other and was discrete with their feud where one of them would often leave the country for days or weeks to escape each other.

Ibejii studied law at the university, he has a twin brother and grew up listening to rock, jùjú, electronic music, jazz and R&B. An essential part of his music-making journey which influences his African and international motifs stems from Yoruba culture and from a musical household that favoured the rich mix tunes of 60s, 70s and 80s.

Career

2016: Early beginnings 
Ibejii's stage name is rooted from and inspired by coming into this world as a twin. In 2016, he released his debut single titled "Ayanfe" which is in Yoruba language. According to Premium Times, "Ayanfe" is solidly rooted in the western Nigerian culture, renowned for its high incidence of twins and musical giants.

2017:  GreenWhiteDope 001 and GreenWhiteDope 002 debut albums 
In 2017 Ibejii released his debut studio albums, GreenWhiteDope 001 and GreenWhiteDope 002 which he launched together, Pulse Nigeria described the project as "a tasteful party: one who seeks to paint pictures, tell stories and drive action with the power of his music." The album received critical reviews from music critics and journalists and was endorsed and aired on radio stations like Classic Fm and Beat Fm. Same year, 3 songs from the album which includes "Ojo", "Kirakita" and "Alejo" were accompanied with music videos. The videos depicts storytelling and portrays African culture.

2018–2021: Tribal Marks, Music Saved My Life, Ìlù Ìlú and Intermission 
He followed GreenWhiteDope 001 and GreenWhiteDope 002 with a third studio album, Tribal Marks released in 2018, which was noted for it's storytelling, African rhythms and classic jazz. As well as themes of spirituality, love, politics, and menace and perils in the society. According to him, the album is a celebration of man, culture people and our place society. The Guardian described the project as "an establishment of Ibejii’s leading status within the alternative music universe". The following year, Ibejii released his 4th studio album MSML (Music Saved My Life). Since then he has released 3 more studio albums, including Ìlù Ìlú his 5th studio album released in 2020, and Intermission, his 6th project released in 2021 which won the Best alternative album at the Headies Awards of 2022, also "Gonto" the lead single for the album was nominated for Best alternative song same year at the Headies 2022."Gonto" which he said was inspired by the actions of Nigerian youths during the End SARS protest was later accompanied with a music video which starred some of Nollywood actors and actresses, and was short lived on stage at Terra Kulture in Lagos, Nigeria. Ibejii songs has been featured on movies like The Wedding Party, Catch.er, and Chief Daddy.

2022–present: POST-19 
POST-19 his 6th project was released in 2022. A 7-track studio album which was later accompanied with music videos each. Business Day in Nigeria described POST-19 as "Ibejii's hyperbolic emotional encounter with lockdown and its offerings which meanders through the innocence and transition of time, life and love and also highlights other issues". A listening party was held for the album at Ikoyi, Lagos State which welcomed guests like Motolani Alake, and Brand Ambassador at Diageo, Tinya Alonge.

The Ibejii Live Experience 
Ibejii established a musical festival tagged "The Ibejii Live Experience", an annual music festival that hosts on every Nigerian Democracy Day.

Artistry 
Ibejii music has been described as multiple genres, fusion of West African percussive sounds with contemporary global music. His style has been described by The Guardian and Vanguard as eclectic, poet, thinker, and a storyteller who uses folklore, metaphor and vernacular to clothe his music and deliver in a unique and sensitive manner, exploring traditional Yoruba folk, Jazz, Dance, RnB, and Juju. Ibejii has listed Marvin Gaye, Fela Kuti, Brymo and Aṣa as some of his musical influences. Ibejii is also known for his rectro afro style.

Critical reception 
In 2021, The Native magazine described "Gonto" as "a candid but soulful rebuke of the casual insensitivity of governments across the world in the wake of the tragedies of 2021 as well as a celebration of a new age of awakening, and Intermission as "a project about finding hope and exhilaration even in the strangest of places".

Discography

Albums 

 GreenWhiteDope 001 (2017)
 GreenWhiteDope 002 (2017)
 Tribal Marks (2018)
 MSML (Music Saved My Life) (2019)
 Ìlù Ìlú (2020)
 Intermission (2021)
 POST-19 (2022)

Singles

References 

Living people
English male singer-songwriters
English people of Nigerian descent
Date of birth missing (living people)
Indie musicians
English soul singers